Anant Kumar Singh is an Indian politician and a former MLA from the Mokama assembly constituency of Bihar. A former member of the Janata Dal (United) party, he joined Rashtriya Janata Dal in 2020. According to his election affidavit of 2020, he is facing 38 criminal charges including 7 murders, 11 attempt-to-murder and 4 cases of kidnapping.

Life and career
Singh was born in the village of Nadawan falling under Barh CD block, Bihar to Chandradeep Singh. He belongs to Bhumihar family. He contested and won from the Mokama assembly seat in 2005 on a JDU ticket. He retained the seat in 2010, defeating Sonam Devi of Lok Janshakti Party (LJP) by a large margin. He is married to Neelam Devi.

On 2 September 2015, Singh quit the JDU following a fall-out with leader Nitish Kumar over the JDU's new alliance with the Rashtriya Janata Dal.

On 16 August 2019, Singh was booked under the Unlawful Activities (Prevention) Act after the police took possession of an AK-47 rifle, a magazine, live cartridges and two hand grenades following a raid on his ancestral home in Ladma village of Patna district.

In 2020, Singh was given a ticket from Rashtriya Janata Dal to contest in the upcoming Bihar legislative election. He won from the Mokama constituency with 35,291 votes, winning for the seat for the fourth consecutive time.

Criminal cases and influence
Singh has numerous cases of murder, kidnapping, and land grabbing lodged against him. The Barh region has remained notorious for dreaded caste wars particularly between two Forward Castes of Bihar, the Bhumihars and Rajputs. In these wars he emerged as a saviour of his community. According to locals, people in this region refrain from going outside during night due to fear of being kidnapped or murdered. The fortune of Singh turned when Nitish Kumar, decided to nominate him as his candidate on the ticket of Janata Dal (United) from the Mokama constituency. It was considered as paradoxical by a section of media that Kumar who vowed to end 'criminalisation of politics' was backing such a person against whom charges of serious cognizable offences were lodged. But, amidst criticism and counter statements Singh managed to win from Mokama seat due to support of his castemen as well as the wave of Nitish Kumar. Singh has been three times MLA from Mokama.

Singh's activities dragged the nation's attention when in 2007 he was reported to have two journalists from NDTV 24×7 and ANI news as hostages in his official bungalow. It was reported that they had been there to interview Singh upon his involvement in murder and molestation of a woman called Reshma Khatoon whose body was recovered in a sack near the capital. The political protection given to Singh and another gangster named Sunil Pandey by the ruling regime was aimed at mobilisation of Bhumihar caste. According to the locals, Singh who was known as Chhote sarkar in Mokama is a role model of Bhumihars, who consistently opposed Laloo Yadav's regime. Thus, political parties opposing Yadav used him as a tool to mobilise Bhumihar voters.

Singh was also allegedly involved in kidnapping of four youths, who as per allegations were responsible for eve-teasing of a girl, latter being sister of one of Singh's men. As per news reports, the four youths were kidnapped and assaulted allegedly by the goons of Singh and one of them named Puttus Yadav was killed brutally.

Electoral history

References

1960s births
Bihar MLAs 2005–2010
Bihar MLAs 2010–2015
Living people
Janata Dal (United) politicians
Crime in Bihar
Indian prisoners and detainees
People from Patna district
Year of birth missing (living people)
Rashtriya Janata Dal politicians
Bihar MLAs 2020–2025
Indian politicians convicted of crimes